A Girl at My Door (lit. “Do-Hee”) is a 2014 South Korean drama film directed by July Jung and stars Bae Doona as a policewoman who takes in an abused girl played by Kim Sae-ron. The film screened in the Un Certain Regard section at the 2014 Cannes Film Festival.

Due to the film's portrayal of a lesbian relationship, and the contentiousness of LGBT rights in South Korea, as well as the initial ambiguous relationship of the two main characters, the film had to be financed largely by the Korean Film Council.

Plot
Following a personal scandal, police academy instructor Lee Young-nam is transferred from Seoul to take office as a chief of the police substation in a quiet seaside town in Yeosu. Young-nam keeps a low profile and tolerates the drunken excesses of the locals, but drinks heavily at home, decanting soju into water bottles.

Young-nam meets Sun Do-hee, a timid and withdrawn 14-year-old girl covered with cuts and bruises. Do-hee is bullied by classmates and beaten by both her drunk stepfather Yong-ha and drunk grandmother; her biological mother abandoned them. The locals keep quiet about Yong-ha's injustices as he is the town's main employer, an oyster farmer.

After the body of Yong-ha's mother is found floating in the water, ruled an accidental death caused by drunk driving, Yong-ha attacks Do-hee again. Concerned for Do-hee's safety, Young-nam offers to let her stay with her during the summer vacation, despite scrutiny from the villagers. For the first time, Do-hee has someone who does not hit her and who calls her by her name instead of swearing at her. Do-hee bathes with Young-nam and imitates her, wearing her uniform and cutting her hair in the same style.

Young-nam is tracked to Yeosu by her ex-girlfriend, who asks her to move to Australia with her. They argue and kiss, and are seen by Yong-ha. When Young-nam discovers that he employs underpaid illegal immigrants, Yong-ha tells the police that Young-nam sexually abused Do-hee. Young-nam is taken into custody. She states she had no improper contact with Do-hee and that taking in an abused child was her duty; the investigator responds that this was inappropriate behavior for a gay woman. Do-hee tells the investigator that Young-nam sexually abused her, and Young-nam is imprisoned. Do-hee is returned to the care of her father and given a number to call if her father beats her again.

At her family home, Do-hee undresses, dials the number and hides the phone, then caresses her sleeping father. He wakes and begins shouting at her. She cries in protest, telling him "it hurts". The police break in and arrest the father. Do-hee tells the investigators that her father told her to lie that Young-nam abused her. Young-nam is released and receives an apology. She visits Do-hee and asks her if she made what happened to her father and grandmother happen on purpose, then leaves. As she is being driven out of town, she tells the officer to stop the car. She finds Do-hee and asks her to come with her.

Cast

 Bae Doona as Lee Young-nam, a chief of police substation
 Kim Sae-ron as Sun Do-hee, Yong-ha's adopted daughter
 Song Sae-byeok as Park Yong-ha
 Kim Jin-gu as Park Jum-soon, Yong-ha's mother
 Son Jong-hak as Captain Eom
 Na Jong-min as Officer Kim
 Gong Myung as Police Officer Kwon Son-oh
 Jang Hee-jin as Eun-jung, Young-nam's ex-lover
 Kim Min-jae as Jun-ho, Young-nam's senior colleague
 Park Jin-woo as Chief detective
 Moon Sung-keun as Nam Gyeong-dae, police superintendent in Seoul
 Kim Jong-gu as Boss Choi
 Arvind Alok as Bakeem, foreign worker
 Robin Shiek as Salam, foreign worker
 Pokhrel Barun as Hoang, foreign worker
 Lee Hyeon-jeong as Young-nam's landlady

Reception
At the film's official Cannes screening at the Theatre Debussy, the audience gave it a three-minute standing ovation and it received mostly positive reviews from the media. Screen Daily called it "a resolutely left-field and refreshingly off-kilter drama [...] a deftly intriguing tale of alcoholism and abuse that starts off as a seemingly familiar domestic drama before spiralling off into something more unnerving and vaguely disturbing. It is driven by a strong cast and makes the most of it rural location that should be an idyllic but in fact its surface beauty covers up a series of rather dysfunctional people. The film is given heart and soul by a magnetic performance by the excellent Doona Bae."

Variety wrote that the "wrenching drama" is a "layered expose of violence and bigotry in provincial Korean society" powered by "mesmerizing" performances by Bae Doona and Kim Sae-ron. It described Bae's portrayal as "both towering and frail," while "Kim is electrifying." Twitch Film praised it as "Korean cinema at its finest," "gripping from start to finish [...] with its fair share of high drama, but unlike most of its Korean compatriots, it never overplays its hand and treats its audience with respect," and "so well-wrought that one can't help but be swept up in its artistry, which effortlessly plunges us into an intellectual reverie." The Korea Herald said it "deftly blends mystery and thriller," "does an impressive job of tackling modern Korean social issues, including alcoholism, homosexuality, small-town politics, migration and labor," and praised "the three lead actors, especially Bae," who "offer memorable performances as troubled, lonely and searching souls."

The Hollywood Reporter was less impressed: "While Jung's efforts to avoid sensationalism and employ multiple threads are very admirable, the result is a mild-mannered piece short of a sufficiently substantial exposition of its plethora of characters and the problem they face. All this leads to Bae giving an internalized performance dangerously close to blankness; fortunately, Kim is on hand with a turn that suitably brings to the screen the psychotic state of her battered character." Film Business Asia also singled out Kim as "the standout performance in a generally impressive first feature by 34-year-old writer-director July Jung, that could have been even better with one more script revision and more animated playing by Bae. Despite that, it's still an involving drama with few dull moments, continually shifting the power balance between the three main protagonists. [...] All of this is a rich concoction that Jung generally brings off. But there are also annoying loose ends that weaken its dramatic impact, [such as] the backgrounds of the three leads are thinly drawn; and the final act has a slightly too manufactured feel. The film could easily lose 10 minutes to its benefit, by shortening or eliminating the repetitive scenes of the girl's beatings."

Awards and nominations

References

External links
  
  A Girl at my Door at Korean Film Council
 
 
 
 

2014 films
2014 directorial debut films
2014 drama films
2014 LGBT-related films
2010s Korean-language films
2010s South Korean films
South Korean drama films
South Korean LGBT-related films
Lesbian-related films
LGBT-related drama films
Films set in South Korea
Films shot in South Korea